Dr. Seuss Goes to War: The World War II Editorial Cartoons of Theodor Seuss Geisel  is a 1999 book written by Richard H. Minear, containing Dr. Seuss's political cartoons created during World War II.

Creating his cartoons for the liberal New York magazine PM, Seuss denounced Adolf Hitler and Benito Mussolini and was highly critical of non-interventionists ("isolationists"), most notably Charles Lindbergh, who opposed US entry into the war. One cartoon depicted all Japanese Americans as latent traitors or fifth-columnists while at the same time other cartoons deplored the racism at home against Jews and blacks that harmed the war effort. His cartoons were strongly supportive of President Franklin D. Roosevelt's handling of the war, combining the usual exhortations to ration and contribute to the war effort with frequent attacks on Congress (especially the Republican Party), parts of the press (such as the New York Daily News, Chicago Tribune and Washington Times-Herald), isolationists (notably Charles Lindbergh), and others for criticism of Roosevelt, criticism of aid to the Soviet Union, investigation of suspected communists, and other offenses that he depicted as leading to disunity and helping the Nazis, intentionally or inadvertently.

Reception
The book was well received. Entertainment Weekly gave it an "A" grade: "This is scathing, fascinating stuff, and with Minear's commentary, it provides a provocative history of wartime politics." People described the book as "How the Führer (Almost) Stole Christmas" and called it "a revelation", although (like many other reviewers) it noted with distate Seuss's "incongruously, appallingly caricatured Japanese-Americans".<ref>"Picks and Pans Review: Dr. Seuss Goes to War", 'People, November 15, 1999.</ref> Gaby Wood of The Guardian commented on the connection between Seuss's war cartoons and the messages in his later work for children, observing, "It is as if, having fought for common sense during the war, Dr Seuss performed a canny shift and turned non-sense to his advantage, making it the plain universal language we needed to hear."

Exhibitions and sequel
The book led to a number of museum exhibitions about Seuss's political work.Douglas Britt, "Idea behind Dr. Seuss show is better than its execution", Houston Chronicle, July 2, 2009. In 2009, a follow-up volume was published entitled Dr. Seuss & Co. Go to War, presenting Seuss's cartoons for PM together with those by other PM'' artists, including Saul Steinberg.

References

External links
"Dr. Seuss Went to War: A Collection of Political Cartoons" at UC San Diego Library Special Collections.

Dr. Seuss
1999 non-fiction books
Editorial cartooning
History books about World War II
The New Press books